KLQL (101.1 FM, "K101") is a radio station broadcasting a "Real" country music format, featuring country music from the 1970s, 1980s, 1990s and today, serving Luverne, Rock Rapids, and Worthington, with rimshot coverage in the Sioux Falls area. The station is currently owned by Alpha Media.

Founding and early history
KLQL was initially licensed to the six founders of Luverne's AM radio station, KQAD, as its FM sibling. KQAD-FM first broadcast at 100.9 MHz and with a power of 6,000 watts. In 1982, KQAD-FM's ownership group (Paul Hedberg, Al McIntosh, Mort Skewes, Warren Schoon, Rollie Swanson, and Dominic Lippi) learned that they could substantially increase the station's power and range with a slight move up the dial from 100.9 to 101.1 MHz. In his autobiography Paul Hedberg explains the reasoning behind this change: "since FM was surging in popularity we decided to go ahead with this upgrade. We submitted the application for a construction permit to effect the change, and it was granted in late 1982. A new 500-foot tower was built north of Luverne, just west of the community of Hardwick. A 12-bay antenna with a 20 kW Gates transmitter delivered our new 100,000-watt signal, and this more than doubled KQAD-FM’s coverage. With this new power and frequency we decided to separate the stations’ programming. We switched our FM to a country and western format, and changed the call letters to KLQL-FM. We wanted to emphasize our new format with a cowboy boot in the logo: KLQL was going to be K101."

References

External links

Country radio stations in the United States
Radio stations in Minnesota